Vedchha railway station is a small railway station on the Western Railway network in the state of Gujarat, India. Vedchha railway station is near Navsari railway station. Passenger and MEMU trains halt here.

In the early 1960s the area immediately around the station was undeveloped but it contributed to the development of the cotton industry in the nearby town of Abrama.

References

See also
 Navsari district

Railway stations in Navsari district
Mumbai WR railway division